The Severn Sailing Association is a private yacht club located in Annapolis, Maryland.

History 
The Association was incorporated on October 28th, 1954 by John J. Hopkins, Richard C. Bartlett, and Robert F. Podlich who wanted to establish a sailing club on Round Bay, Severna Park. But due to local zoning laws such an establishment was prohibited, so the search was extended all over the Severn River. Finally, three cottages on the water at the end of First Street in Eastport were bought and in 1958, a dock was constructed and the boats of the five initial centerboard fleets (Penguins, Comets, National One-Designs, Severn One-Designs and International 14's) were launched.

Mission 
 To promote, foster, encourage, and sponsor one-design sailing, sailing races and activities connected with sailing on the Severn River.
 To promote the education of the youth of the surrounding communities in the sport of sailing and the safe and proper handling of small craft.
 To promote and encourage local participation in regional and national sailing activities
 To cooperate with and participate in the activities of the various community organizations and civic associations dedicated to the preservation and improvement of the Severn River area.
 To promote the preservation and observance of the "Rules of the Road", yachting customs and courtesies.
 To conduct social occasions for sailors and advocates of sailing.

Fleets 

One-Design racing club fleets include:
Day Sailer
ILCA 6/7
J/22
J/24
J/70
Lightning
Snipe
Soling
Star
Thistle

Major Regattas 
 1960 Adams Cup
 1971 Snipe US Nationals
 1978 Snipe North American Championship
 1981 Snipe US Nationals
 1984 International 420 World Championship
 1985 Snipe North American Championship
 1990 Snipe US Nationals
 1991 Lightning World Championship
 1992 J24 World Championship
 1994 Snipe North American Championship
 1995 Laser US Nationals
 2000 Lightning North Americans
 2005 Optimist US Team Trials
 2005 Laser Masters National Championship
 2010 Snipe US Nationals
 2016 Snipe North American Championship
 2017 5o5 World Championship
 2021 Snipe US Nationals
 2022 Soling North American Championship

Commodores 
 2023-     Bruce Empey
 2021-2022 Eric Johnson
 2019-2020 Jonathan Phillips
 2017-2018 Kim Couranz
 2015-2016 Peter Rich
 2013-2014 David Koepper 
 2011-2012 Hal Whitacre
 2009-2010 Luke Shingledecker
 2007-2008 Joe Van Gieson
 2005-2006 Ted Morgan
 2003-2004 Alex Stout
 2001-2002 John Quay
 1999-2000 Tim Cusack
 1997-1998 Peter Hale
 1995-1996 Dina Kowalyshyn
 1993-1994 Griff Hall
 1991-1992 Steve Palmer
 1989-1990 Paul Weiss
 1987-1988 Chuck Millican
 1985-1986 Tom Davies
 1983-1984 Mark Hasslinger
 1981-1982 Larry White
 1979-1980 Jim Laudeman
 1977-1978 Jack Colwell
 1975-1976 Eric Arens
 1973-1974 Sam Merrick
 1971-1972 Richard C. Bartlett Jr.
 1968-1970 Robert Reeves
 1966-1967 Crombie Garrett
 1964-1965 Robert Tate
 1963 Stuart H. Walker
 1962 Pharo Gagge
 1957-1961 Stuart H. Walker
 1955-1956 John J. Hopkins

Sailors 
Sam Merrick, former chairman of the United States Olympic yachting committee.
Stuart Walker, National Sailing Hall of Fame 2013 inductee.
Carol Cronin and Kim Couranz, 2018 Women's Snipe World Champions.

References

External links 
Official website

1954 establishments in Maryland
Sailing in Maryland 
Sports in Annapolis, Maryland
Yacht clubs in the United States